Michael DeAngelo Dickerson (born June 25, 1975) is an American former professional basketball player who was a member of the Houston Rockets and Vancouver / Memphis Grizzlies of the National Basketball Association (NBA). The  shooting guard was born in Greenville, South Carolina and raised in both Kent, Washington and Federal Way, Washington.

Career

Before the NBA 
He played basketball at Decatur High School (Federal Way, Washington) in his sophomore season followed by Federal Way High School in his junior and senior years. Although never substantiated, rumors persisted that his coach had rented an apartment within Federal Way High School's boundaries, and allowed him to live there in order to play for that school's team.  He went to college at the University of Arizona, where he won the 1997 national championship on a team with Mike Bibby, Jason Terry, and Miles Simon. Dickerson was Arizona's leading scorer in the 1996-97 championship season (18.9 points per game) and averaged another team-high 18.0 points per game in 1997-98. In 2011, he was inducted into the Pac-12 Hall of Honor.

Houston Rockets (1998–99) 
He was selected as the 14th overall pick by the Rockets in the 1998 NBA draft and played for them during the lockout-shortened 1999 NBA season, in which Dickerson led the league in games played (50), was sixth in three-point field goal percentage (.433), and was named to the All-Rookie 2nd Team. He was reluctantly traded in 1999 to the Vancouver Grizzlies for Vancouver's draft pick, Steve Francis, who had demanded a trade because he did not want to play for Vancouver.

Vancouver/Memphis Grizzlies (1999–2003) 
Dickerson played all 82 games for the Grizzlies in 1999–2000, averaging 18.2 points, 3.4 rebounds, 2.5 assists and 1.41 steals per game. His scoring average fell to 16.3 points per game the following season. After the Grizzlies relocated to Memphis, Tennessee, he played in just four and six games over the next two seasons due to injuries. Dickerson was released by the Grizzlies on October 27, 2003 and prematurely retired due to severe hamstring and groin injuries from which he was unable to fully recover. Dickerson was one of the few players in the history of the team that publicly expressed they enjoyed their time in Vancouver.

Cleveland Cavaliers (2008) 
Dickerson was invited to training camp by the Cleveland Cavaliers, but was waived on October 8, 2008. He holds career NBA averages of 15.4 points, 2.9 rebounds and 2.6 assists per game in 212 contests. During his retirement he traveled to India and Tibet.

Spanish League 
In 2009, Dickerson returned to basketball for one year as a member of Faymasa Palencia, playing in the second league of the Spanish basketball league system. He appeared in four games for Palencia, averaging 11.8 points per outing. At the end of the season, he retired once more.

NBA career statistics

Regular season 

|-
| style="text-align:left;"| 1998–99
| style="text-align:left;"| Houston
| 50 || 50 || 31.2 || .465 || .433 || .639 || 1.7 || 1.9 || 0.5 || 0.2 || 10.9
|-
| style="text-align:left;"| 1999–00
| style="text-align:left;"| Vancouver
| 82 || 82 || 37.8 || .436 || .409 || .830 || 3.4 || 2.5 || 1.4 || 0.5 || 18.2
|-
| style="text-align:left;"| 2000–01
| style="text-align:left;"| Vancouver
| 70 || 69 || 37.4 || .417 || .374 || .763 || 3.3 || 3.3 || 0.9 || 0.4 || 16.3
|-
| style="text-align:left;"| 2001–02
| style="text-align:left;"| Memphis
| 4 || 4 || 31.0 || .313 || .381 || .833 || 3.0 || 2.3 || 0.8 || 0.3 || 10.8
|-
| style="text-align:left;"| 2002–03
| style="text-align:left;"| Memphis
| 6 || 1 || 14.5 || .417 || .364 || 1.000 || 1.0 || 1.3 || 0.8 || 0.2 || 4.8
|-
|- class="sortbottom"
| style="text-align:center;" colspan="2"| Career
| 212 || 206 || 35.3 || .432 || .402 || .784 || 2.9 || 2.6 || 1.0 || 0.4 || 15.4

Playoffs 

|-
|style="text-align:left;"|1999
|style="text-align:left;"|Houston
||4||4||20.5||.273||.375||.500||1.0||0.8||0.5||0.8||4.3

Personal
Dickerson is a cousin of former NBA guard David Wesley, and is a father to two daughters.

Notes

External links
Michael Dickerson's stats @ BasketballReference

1975 births
Living people
African-American basketball players
All-American college men's basketball players
American expatriate basketball people in Canada
American expatriate basketball people in Italy
American men's basketball players
Arizona Wildcats men's basketball players
Basketball players from South Carolina
Basketball players from Washington (state)
Houston Rockets draft picks
Houston Rockets players
Memphis Grizzlies players
Palencia Baloncesto players
People from Federal Way, Washington
Shooting guards
Sportspeople from Greenville, South Carolina
Sportspeople from King County, Washington
Vancouver Grizzlies players
21st-century African-American sportspeople
20th-century African-American sportspeople